André de Azevedo (born July 8, 1959 in São José dos Campos) is a Brazilian rally raid truck driver. He won 10 stages at Dakar Rally with Tatra trucks and reached his personal best at 2003 Dakar Rally with 2nd place.

Dakar Rally results

 In progress

References 

1959 births
Living people
Brazilian rally drivers
Off-road racing drivers
Rally raid truck drivers
People from São José dos Campos
Sportspeople from São Paulo (state)